Sean J. Kennedy (born September 20, 1971 in Philadelphia, Pennsylvania) is an American drum set player, percussionist, recording artist, author and educator.  Kennedy's drumset method book Camp Jam: Rock Solid Drums was nominated as Educational Drum Book of the Year in the 2011 Modern Drummer magazine reader's poll.  Kennedy's release Sixty Second Solos won 2nd Runner Up in the 2015 DRUMMIES, DRUM! Magazine an annual readers poll award.  Kennedy has been officially recognized by Guinness World Records for participating in "most people performing a drum roll online simultaneously", with Legacy 150 Celebrations Society, Vancouver, Canada.

"Kaku, kupala| Fear in Neutral Buoyancy" an original orchestral composition by Sean J. Kennedy - premiered at Carnegie Hall, September 27, 2015, performed by Youth Philharmonic International Orchestra, conducted by Jose Luis Gomez.

Since April 2016, Sean J. Kennedy has produced and hosted the music-industry podcast Backstage At The Enharmonic.  Guests have included many musical innovators and legends including, Dame Evelyn Glennie, Hal Blaine, Gordon Goodwin, Harold Jones (drummer), Nitzan Haroz, Donald Nally, Richie Cannata, Jerry Weldon, Julian Bliss and many others.

Kennedy's "Lux Contritum (Broken Light)" an original choral piece with orchestral accompaniment commissioned by the Archdiocese of Philadelphia had its debut performance on April 17, 2018, at the Kimmel Center's Verizon Hall, in Philadelphia, Pennsylvania, and was conducted by Kennedy.

September 2018, Kennedy presented a TedX Talk called Happy Accidents: Drumming Up Serendipity, which explores how serendipity, or happy accidents, can influence and change our lives. The talk was presented to a local audience at TEDxWilmington.

In 2020 Kennedy founded The Rolling Buzzards Brigade, an American chamber ensemble that is located in Philadelphia, Pennsylvania. The ensemble creates virtual performances of arrangements of 18th Century military/patriotic music.

The group has received widespread press coverage in Modern Drummer, International Musician, the official journal of The American Federation of Musicians of the United States and Canada., Irish Philadelphia, and Make Music Magazine.

The group's recordings have also been premiered on US classical musical radio stations.  Including WWFM, The Classical Network's show Cadenza with David Osenberg, and on WLRH 89.3 FM/HD Huntsville's 2020 4 July celebration, "Benjamin Franklin's Favorite Protest Song of the Revolutionary War"

Reception within the drumming community has been overwhelmingly positive, culminating in an online interview at DrummerNation.com, hosted by Michael Vosbein, featuring Sean J. Kennedy, Bernie Dresel, Clayton Cameron and audio engineer Andrew Torre.

Members of The Rolling Buzzards Brigade include: Sean J. Kennedy, Bernie Dresel, Clayton Cameron, Chris Colaneri, Chris Coletti, David Earll, Evelyn Glennie, Neil Grover, Nitzan Haroz, Heather High-Kennedy, Tawnee Lynn, David Lu, Sherrie Maricle, Dave Nelson, Chihiro Shibayama, Gabriel Staznik, and John Wooton.

Sean J. Kennedy is a member of the Percussive Arts Society Drum Set Committee.

Discography

With The Sean J. Kennedy Quartet
 Road to Wailea (2004)
 Queen Anne's Revenge(2007) featuring Bob Mintzer and Liberty DeVitto
 Hey! Where's My Tux?! (2013)

With The KAV Trio
 Outta' Here! (2011)

With Ramblin' Ant & The Locust Street Band
  Ramblin' Ant & The Locust Street Band (2010)

With Philadelphia Boys Choir & Chorale
 Celebrate the Sounds of the Season (2009) 
 Sing, Choir of Angels (DVD) (2011) 
 Celebrate the Sounds of the Season (with bonus disc) (2012)
 Winter Wonderland (2016)

With Allentown Band
 Our Band Heritage, Volume 17: Seasons Greetings (2002)
 Our Band Heritage, Volume 18: Band on Broadway (2003)
 Our Band Heritage, Volume 19: Sesquicentennial: The Music of John Philip Sousa (2004)
 Our Band Heritage, Volume 20: A World of Marches (2005)

With The Bob Wagner Quartet
 Toot Suite (2018)

With The Rolling Buzzards Brigade
 The Downfall of Paris (2020)
 Connecticut Halftime and The Three Camps (2020)

Publications
"Camp Jam: Rock Solid Drums" Carl Fischer Music co-author Liberty DeVitto
"I Used to Play Drums" Carl Fischer Music co-author Liberty DeVitto
"Improvising and Soloing In The Pocket" Carl Fischer Music co-author Richie Cannata
"Sixty Second Solos" Alfred Music

"Help! I'm Not a Drummer!... but I have some in my ensemble" Carl Fischer Music 
June 2021 edition of Modern Drummer Magazine, featured article, "Mentor | Sean J. Kennedy Salutes Ray Deeley"

References

Living people
1971 births
American jazz composers
American male jazz composers
American jazz drummers
Musicians from Philadelphia
20th-century American drummers
American male drummers
Jazz musicians from Pennsylvania
21st-century American drummers
20th-century American male musicians
21st-century American male musicians